The 1997 International Sports Racing Series season was the first season of International Sports Racing Series (later known as the FIA Sportscar Championship).  It was a series for sportscar style prototypes broken into two classes based on power and weight, called SR1 and SR2.  It began on July 6, 1997, and ended November 9, 1997, after 4 races.

As a new series, and with only 4 races, no championships were awarded for teams or drivers.

Schedule

Season results

† - Round 3 was included in the championship, but only 1 SR2-class car participated.  The race was instead made up of CN and S2000 based hillclimb cars.

External links
 1997 International Sports Racing Series results

International Sports Racing Series
FIA Sportscar Championship